Amandus Polanus von Polansdorf (16 December 1561, Opava, Silesia – 17 July 1610, Basel, Switzerland) was a German theologian of early Reformed orthodoxy. After his education in Opava, Wrocław, Tübingen, Basel, and Geneva (1577–1584), he served as a tutor to the family of Zierotin in Heidelberg and Basel (1584–1590), and later taught at the Bohemian Brethren school in Ivančice. Between 1591 and 1595 he again tutored for the Zierotins, traveling from Moravia to Strasbourg and Basel. Polanus spent the last part of his life in Basel, where he became professor of Old Testament in April 1596, and later that year married the daughter of the professor of ancient languages, Johann Jakob Grynaeus (1540–1617). Polanus also served as a dean of the theological faculty between 1598 and 1600, and again later between 1601 and 1609, and he was rector of Basel University in 1600 and 1609.

He wrote the three volume dogmatic work Partitiones theologicae (Divisions of Theology) and Syntagma theologiae christianae (translated in English as A System of Christian Theology). In 1603, based on Luther's translation, Polanus composed the first Calvinistic German translation of the Bible. His major systematic works are marked by Aristotelian causal analysis and, most strikingly, by the methodology of Ramism. He showed concern for precision and clarity of presentation and polemical defense of Reformed doctrine. Yet he showed little interest in metaphysical speculation. His doctrine of God was central but it, and predestination, were balanced by other interests: Christology, covenant, ethics, and praxis. A consolidator not an innovator, his concern was to preserve Reformed teaching, so serving the contemporary needs of the church.

References

Further reading

Byung Soo Han, Symphonia Catholica: the merger of patristic and contemporary sources in the theological method of Amandus Polanus (1561-1610), Göttingen: Vandenhoeck & Ruprecht, 2015 (Reformed Historical Theology, 30). -

External links
A list of Polanus' works at the Post-Reformation Digital Library
The Correspondence of Amandus Polanus of Polansdorf in EMLO
Summaries of Syntagma by Wes Brendenhof
Table of Contents of Syntagma in English by Travis Fentiman
The Meaning and Method of Systematic Theology in Amandus Polanus by Max Eugene Deal
English translation of Syntagma in 10 volumes
The Substance of Christian Religion

German Calvinist and Reformed theologians
17th-century Calvinist and Reformed theologians
17th-century German Protestant theologians
1561 births
1610 deaths
German male non-fiction writers
17th-century German writers
17th-century German male writers